A sports rivalry exists between the national soccer teams of Mexico and the United States, widely considered the two major powers of CONCACAF. The first match was played in 1934, and the teams have met 74 times, with Mexico leading the overall series 36–16–22 (W–D–L). The U.S. holds the edge since 2000 though, with a 17–7–9 (W–D–L) advantage in the 21st century. 

Matches between the two nations often attract much media attention, public interest, and comment in both countries. The U.S.-Mexico matches are widely attended; several matches at the Estadio Azteca in Mexico have drawn over 100,000 fans, and several matches at the Rose Bowl in the United States have drawn over 90,000 fans.

The most important matchups take place in quadrennial FIFA World Cup qualification matches and major tournaments such as the CONCACAF Gold Cup. The rivalry plays out often in annual friendlies scheduled during the early months in U.S. cities with large Mexican-American populations such as Los Angeles, Houston, and Chicago.

History

Origin
The first match between the two sides was a qualifying match in Italy for the final ticket to the 1934 World Cup. The U.S. had established a professional league in 1921, but it had folded in 1933. The final score was United States 4–2 Mexico. In September 1937, Mexico began a winning streak over the U.S. in friendlies 7–2, 7–3, and 5–1 in Mexico City.

Results

Summary
Mexico leads the series 36–16–22, with almost double the goals of the U.S. (144–86).

 
*no longer played

Gold Cup finals
The United States and Mexico have met in seven Gold Cup finals to date, with Mexico holding a five games to two lead over the United States.

Nations League finals

List of matches

Player eligibility
The United States and Mexico also compete to convince players who are eligible to play for both the United States and Mexico (e.g., a player who was born in the United States to Mexican parents) to play for their particular national team. As of January 25, 2023, five players; Martín Vásquez, Edgar Castillo, Julián Araujo, Jonathan Gómez and Alejandro Zendejas have played senior level matches for both nations. 

Other cases include William Yarbrough, Isaác Brizuela, Miguel Ponce, Jonathan González, Efraín Álvarez and more recently in the cases of David Ochoa and Julian Araujo.

 Ruben Mendoza – born March 2, 1931, in St. Louis, Missouri to Mexican parents, was a dominant player in the St. Louis leagues during the 1950s and 1960s. He earned four caps with the U.S. national team and was a member of the 1952, 1956 and 1960 U.S. Olympic teams.
 Gerardo Mascareño – born July 4, 1970, in Silver Spring, Maryland began his professional career with the Los Angeles Lazers of the MISL in 1988. Later builds a career Mexico in the early 1990s where he plays for both of Guadalajara's top clubs and bitter rivals (Atlas and Guadalajara), this move stirred controversy as it was revealed that Mascareño himself was not born on Mexican soil. On October 23, 1996, Mascareño makes his sole appearance with the Mexico national team in a friendly match against Ecuador, losing the match 1–0.
 William Yarbrough – born March 20, 1989, in Aguascalientes, Mexico to American parents, has an extensive career with Liga MX club León. Yarbrough did participate with a Mexico U20 squad in 2007 but did not obtain any playing minutes. In March 2015 he appears for the U.S. team in a friendly against Switzerland.
 Isaác Brizuela – born August 28, 1990, in San Jose, California to Mexican parents. Brizuela has made an entire career with Liga MX clubs Toluca, Atlas and Guadalajara. He was part of the Mexican delegation that obtained the gold medal in the 2011 Pan American Games. He makes his full appearance with Mexico in 2013.
 Miguel Ponce – born April 12, 1989, in Sacramento holds an extensive career with Liga MX clubs Guadalajara, Toluca and Necaxa. Ponce was part of the Mexico squads that took part in the 2011 Copa América, obtained gold medals at the 2011 Pan American Games and the 2012 Olympic Games. Makes his full appearance scoring one goal at the 2013 CONCACAF Gold Cup.
 Jonathan González – born April 13, 1999, in Santa Rosa to Mexican parents. A product of the U.S. national team youth program, González was part of the U.S. U20 squad that won the 2017 CONCACAF U-20 Championship. In 2014 he enters Liga MX club Monterrey's juvenile program and is eventually promoted to the senior squad in July 2017. In December 2017 González publicly states his wish to represent Mexico on the official scale. In January 2018 FIFA granted his request and he made his full appearance with Mexico on January 31 in a friendly match against Bosnia and Herzegovina. González has also been involved in Mexico's youth squad projects such as the 2018 Toulon Tournament in which Mexico's U20 ended as runners-up of the tournament.
 Efraín Álvarez – born June 19, 2002, in Los Angeles, California to Mexican parents, Álvarez, a product of the LA Galaxy youth reserve made his first team debut appearance with the Galaxy in March 2019. In 2015 Álvarez made appearances with the United States U15 squad leaving a good impression on the youth level scene. However, a snubbing in part of US Soccer in 2016 made Álvarez reconsider on whether to continue in the US youth development program or move to Mexico. During the 2019 FIFA U-17 World Cup he scored 4 goals for the Mexico U17 squad which earned him good press reviews. In November 2020, he was called up for a senior U.S. national team training camp session prior to a friendly match against El Salvador which was to take place on December 9. However, he did not receive any playing minutes as his FIFA clearance eligibility had not been met. In March 2021, he was listed on both the U.S. and Mexican Olympic team preliminary rosters but his clearance situation was still undetermined. Finally in March 2021, Álvarez accepts call-ups to the Mexico national squad making his debut appearance on March 30 in a friendly match against Costa Rica. On July 10, 2021, Efraín Álvarez became officially cap-tied to the Mexico national team due to having relieved an injured Hirving Lozano early on against Trinidad and Tobago in the opening match of the 2021 CONCACAF Gold Cup.
 David Ochoa – born January 16, 2001, in Oxnard, California to Mexican parents, plays with MLS side D.C. United since 2022. Ochoa had recently represented the USMNT's U17, U18 and U23 youth levels and was even part of the senior USMNT as the third choice goalkeeper during the 2021 CONCACAF Nations League Finals. Shortly after the Nations League final it was reported that Ochoa spent time training with the Mexico national team ahead of the 2021 CONCACAF Gold Cup as he did not receive any playing minutes with the USMNT during the Nations League. In August 2021, Ochoa files a one-time switch to FIFA to join the Mexico national team.
Julian Araujo – born August 13, 2001, in Lompoc, California, Araujo had already represented various USMNT youth level squads and even appeared in one friendly match with the senior USMNT in December 2020 against El Salvador. In August 2021, Araujo had requested a one-time switch to FIFA to join the Mexico national team. FIFA authorized the transfer in early October 2021.

Managers
Only one manager has managed both national teams; Bora Milutinović, who managed Mexico first from 1983 to 1986, playing host to that years World Cup and a second time from 1995 to 1997. With the United States, Milutinović managed the Stars and Stripes from 1991 to 1995, again playing host in the 1994 FIFA World Cup.

Incidents 
Prior to an Olympic qualifying game in Guadalajara, Mexico, on February 10, 2004, Mexican media reported that U.S. player Landon Donovan urinated on the field during practice, which angered Mexican fans and media outlets. Subsequent video showed Donovan actually urinated near some bushes outside the practice areas. Two days later, on February 12, 2004, Mexico defeated the U.S. 4–0, and the crowd was heard chanting "Osama, Osama, Osama", in reference to Osama bin Laden and the September 11, 2001, terrorist attacks.

In a friendly held in Glendale, Arizona on February 7, 2007, Landon Donovan scored in injury time to give the U.S. a 2–0 lead and win over Mexico. After the goal, Mexico goalkeeper Oswaldo Sánchez tried to trip U.S. player Eddie Johnson as Johnson was running to celebrate the goal. No contact was made, and no reprimand resulted.

On February 11, 2009, the first qualifier for the 2010 World Cup was held in Columbus Crew Stadium, and resulted in a 2–0 victory for the U.S. against Mexico. After the game, as both teams headed through the tunnels to the locker room, Mexican assistant coach Francisco "Paco" Javier Ramírez slapped Frankie Hejduk in the face. Hejduk did not retaliate, and Ramirez was not reprimanded.

On June 6, 2021, in the first CONCACAF Nations League final at Empower Field at Mile High in Denver, the game between the two rivals was marred by several incidents of overly physical play, team brawls, and the injuries sustained by US player Gio Reyna after being hit by a fan-thrown projectile after the US took the lead 3–2.

Women's soccer
The two countries also have a rivalry between their women's teams, though the United States has won most matchups.

On January 28, 2018, the Mexican U-20 squad defeated the United States' team in the finals of the 2018 CONCACAF Women's U-20 Championship. After a 1–1 draw in the first 90 minutes, Mexico won the match on penalty kicks, scoring 4 against the U.S. total of 2. It was the third time the CONCACAF U-20 Championship featured U.S. and Mexico in the final game, and the first time that Mexico won.

Summary 
The United States leads the series 40–1–1, outscoring Mexico 172–15.

List of Matches

In popular culture
A 2012 documentary, Gringos at the Gate /  Ahi Vienen Los Gringos, written and directed by Pablo Miralles, Roberto Donati, and Michael Whalen,
focuses on the cultural differences between the United States and Mexico when it comes to football. This includes the conflict of Mexican-American players in the U.S. while their family might support Mexico.

See also
 Hexagonal (CONCACAF)

Notes

References

External links
Archive of U.S. national team results 1885–1979
Archive of U.S. national team results 1980–
Gringos at the Gate Documentary film about the U.S. and Mexico football rivalry

 
International association football rivalries
United States
United States men's national football team
Sports rivalries in the United States
1934 establishments in North America

fr:États-Unis-Mexique en football